HMTSS Te Mataili II (802) is the second  completed, and the first to be given to the small Pacific Ocean nation Tuvalu.  She was commissioned on 5 April 2019, replacing , a Pacific Forum patrol vessel, that had reached the end of her designed lifetime.

Background

The first vessel was delivered in 1987, and in 2015 Australia announced plans to replace the original patrol boats with larger and more capable vessels.

Design

Australian ship builder Austal won the $335 million Australian dollar contract for the project, and built the vessels at its Henderson shipyard, near Perth.  Guardian-class vessels were designed to use commercial off-the-shelf components, not cutting edge, military grade equipment, to make them easier to maintain in small isolated shipyards.

Their design allows the recipient nations to mount a pair of heavy machine guns, on either flank, and possibly an autocannon of up to 30 mm, on the foredeck.

Operational career

In July 2019, Inspector Seleganui Fusi, commanding officer of the Te Mataili II, hosted a delegation from Timor, letting them prepare for the arrival of their patrol vessels.

References

Ships of Tuvalu
Te Mataili
2018 ships
Ships built by Austal